Doris Arden (born 1946) is a former German film and television actress. She also did a number of shoots as a glamour model.

Selected filmography
 Carmen, Baby (1967)
 Hot Pavements of Cologne (1967)
 So Much Naked Tenderness (1968)
 Soft Shoulders, Sharp Curves (1972)
 Nurse Report (1972)

References

Bibliography 
 Peter Cowie & Derek Elley. World Filmography: 1967. Fairleigh Dickinson University Press, 1977.

External links 

German film actresses
Glamour models
People from Traunstein
1946 births
Living people